Orion, also known as Mentor or Advanced Orion, is a class of United States spy satellites that collect signals intelligence (SIGINT) from space. Operated by the National Reconnaissance Office (NRO) and developed with input from the Central Intelligence Agency (CIA), eight have been launched from Cape Canaveral on Titan IV and Delta IV launch vehicles since 1995.

These satellites at geostationary orbits collect radio emissions (SIGINT) and act as replacements for the older constellation of Magnum satellites. The satellites have estimated mass close to 5,200 kg and very large (estimated 100 m diameter) radio reflecting dishes. USA-223 (NROL-32), which is seen as the fifth satellite in the series, is according to NRO director Bruce Carlson "the largest satellite in the world." The mission and capabilities of these satellites are highly classified, though targets may include telemetry, VHF radio, cellular mobile phones, paging signals, and mobile data links. Earlier satellites with similar missions, the Rhyolite/Aquacade series, were built by TRW; it is not known who made the Orion satellites.

Satellites 
Mentor-4 (USA-202) deployment and initial westward drift after launch in January 2009 was controlled by the Alice Springs Mission Ground Station. About 60 days after launch Menwith Hill Ground Station was to take over control and initiate the collection mission. Mentor-4's initial mission was to survey line-of-sight microwave towers and emitters in the People's Republic of China for 30 to 45 days as it was drifting from east to west. Moving further west, it was to collect data from the Thuraya network and monitor Pakistan and Afghanistan, followed by another 200 days of monitoring of China. This was to be followed by data collection covering the Middle East, Northern Africa, and Latin America.

References

External links 
 Advanced Orion at Encyclopedia Astronautica
 Magnum/ Mentor/ Orion at Globalsecurity.org
 The USA 202 ORION satellite 

Reconnaissance satellites of the United States
Signals intelligence satellites
Military equipment introduced in the 1990s